Preston Eugene Epps (July 19, 1930 – May 9, 2019) was an American percussionist.

Career
Epps was born in Mangum, Oklahoma. He learned to play percussion instruments, including the bongos, while he was stationed in Okinawa during the Korean War. After his tour of duty he settled in Southern California, playing in coffee shops and working odd jobs. Arthur Laboe, a local disc jockey, signed him to Original Sound Records, which released his single "Bongo Rock" in 1959. The tune became a hit in the U.S., reaching #14 on the Billboard Hot 100 that year. The follow-up, "Bongo Bongo Bongo", reached #78 the following year. Original Sound released a full-length LP in 1960, which reached #35 on the Billboard 200. However, further bongo-themed singles, including "Bongo in the Congo", "Bongo Rocket", "Bootlace Bongo", "Bongo Boogie", "Flamenco Bongo", "Mr. Bongo", and "Bongo Shuffle", did not result in any further success.

Epps reappeared in 1969 as a bongo player in the film Girl in Gold Boots. He continued on as a session musician in the 1960s and 1970s. In 1973, the Incredible Bongo Band recorded "Bongo Rock" and released it as a single.

Epps continued playing in clubs in Southern California into the 1990s. He died of natural causes in Los Angeles on May 9, 2019 at age 88.

Discography w/Billboard chart peak positions

Singles  
 Bongo Rock (#14)/Bongo Party—Original Sound 4 -- 1959
 Bongo Bongo Bongo (#78)/Hully Gully Bongo—Original Sound 9 -- 1960
 Bongo Shuffle/Bongo In The Congo—Original Sound 14—1960
 Blue Bongo/Bongola—Top Rank 2067—1960
 Bongo Hop/Caravan—Top Rank 2091—1960
 Bongo Boogie/Flamenco Bongo—Majesty 1300—1960
 Bongo Rocket/Jungle Drums—Original Sound 17—1961
 Rockin' In The Congo/Sing Donna Go—Embassy 203—1961
 Mister Bongos/B'wana Bongos—Donna 1367—1962
 Bongo Express/Flamenco Bongo—Admiral 901—1963
 Bongo Rock '65/Bongo Waltz—Polo 218—1965
 Afro Mania/Love Is The Only Good Thing—Jo Jo 106—1969

Albums
Calypso Trinidad ("Louis Polliemon and Lord Preston Epps")—Crown Records 5301— 1957
Bongo Bongo Bongo (#35) -- Original Sound LPM-5002 (Mono)/LPS-8851 (Stereo) -- 1960
(All tracks from stereo copies are in stereo except Bongo Rock which is mono)
Bongola—Top Rank RM-349 (Mono)/RS-349 (Stereo) -- 1961
Surfin' Bongos—Original Sound LPM-5009/LPS-8872—1963

References

External links
Preston Epps Interview NAMM Oral History Library (2013)

1930 births
2019 deaths
American session musicians
American percussionists
Top Rank Records artists
Musicians from Oakland, California
Bongo players
Original Sound artists